The Connacht Intermediate Club Football Championship is a Gaelic football competition played between the Intermediate Championship winner from each county in Connacht. The winners compete for the All-Ireland Intermediate Club Football Championship.

Recent championships

2019

2018

List of finals

References

See also
Munster Intermediate Club Football Championship
Leinster Intermediate Club Football Championship
Ulster Intermediate Club Football Championship

2